Kumkum the Dancer is a 1940 Bollywood film directed by Modhu Bose. It was released in both Bengali and Hindi.

Cast
Sadhana Bose as Kumkum
Dhiraj Bhattacharya as Chandan
Preeti Majumdar as Pradeep
Padma Devi  			
Moni Chatterjee 			
Shashadhar Chatterjee 			
Lalit Rai 			
Binita Gupta			
Labanya Palit 			
Abani Mitra		
Kabir Ray 			
Bhujanga Ray	 		
Kira Devi		
Josobant Agashi
Shanta Majumdar

References

External links
 

1940 films
Bengali-language Indian films
1940s Hindi-language films
Indian drama films
1940 drama films
Indian black-and-white films
Hindi-language drama films
1940s multilingual films
Indian multilingual films